Cola Creek is a blackwater creek in Suriname's Para District. The name refers to the colour of the water, which resembles that of Coca-Cola. On weekends many tourists visit the creek from Paramaribo as it is only a short drive away. The resort on the creek was built during World War II for the American soldiers stationed at Zanderij.

References  

Rivers of Suriname
Para District